Petre Mavrogheni (November 1819 – 20 April 1887) also known as Petru Mavrogheni was a Romanian politician who served as the Minister of Foreign Affairs from 11 May until 13 July 1866 and as the Minister of Finance.

Life and career
Petre was born in Iași, Moldavia in 1819 into noble Mavrogheni family. He was a conservative politician who started his career as prefect of Galați in 1849. He then served as the Minister of Finance of Principality of Moldavia in 1861, after which he held the office of Minister of Finance of Romania, serving three terms from 16 February 1866 to 10 May 1866, from 15 July 1866 to 21 February 1867, and from 11 March 1871 to 7 January 1875. He also held the office of  Minister of Foreign Affairs from 11 May until 13 July 1866. Mavrogheni was then the Ambassador of Romania to Italy in 1881–1882, to the Ottoman Empire in 1882–1885, and to Austria-Hungary in 1885–1887.

In 1855, Mavrogheni along with Mihail Kogălniceanu drafted a bill for  legislation which would abolish the slavery of the Roma minority in Moldavia. On 22 December 1855 the law was voted on and slavery was abolished.

References

1819 births
1887 deaths
Politicians from Iași
Romanian Ministers of Foreign Affairs
Romanian Ministers of Finance
Ambassadors of Romania to Italy
Ambassadors of Romania to the Ottoman Empire
Ambassadors of Romania to Austria-Hungary
Diplomats from Iași